The 2012 Abilene Christian Wildcats football team represented Abilene Christian University in the 2012 NCAA Division II football season as a member of the Lone Star Conference (LSC). The Wildcats were led by first year head coach Ken Collums and played their home games at Shotwell Stadium in Abilene, Texas.

During the 2012 season, Abilene Christian ended in fifth place in the LSC with 4–4 record and 7–4 overall with a win over No. 13 West Alabama. Abilene Christian became just third program to have three consecutive 12,000-yard passers after Hawaii and Houston.
The Wildcats had also the best punt return in college football averaging 25.2 yards per return.

Previous season
The Wildcats finished the 2011 NCAA Division II football season with an 8–3 overall record, and a 7–1 record in Lone Star play to second place. They reached the NCAA Division II playoff where they were defeated by Washburn in the first round. After the season, Christ Thomsen resign Abilene Christian head football coach for an assistant coach position at Arizona State.

Recruiting
Abilene Christian signed 13 new players on national signing day

Pre-season

Abeline Christian were ranked no. 10 in the American Football Coaches' Association pre-season poll and no. 13 by Lindy's magazine.
The ACU Wildcats were picked to finish 2nd in the conference behind Midwest State.

Mitchell Gale was not only awarded Lone Star Conference pre-season player of the year but also chosen pre-season NCAA DII offensive player of the year by Lindy's. Mitchell Gale and Morgan Lineberry (placekicker) were selected 
first team All-American and Taylor Gabriel (WR) made the third-team.

Transfers
Will Latu (OL) transferred from Oklahoma

Personnel

Schedule

Game summaries

McMurry 

2012 McMurry War Hawks football team

Sources:

    
    
    
    
    
    
    

In the opener ACU played the NCAA DII newcomer and cross town rival, McMurry Warhawks. It was the first game as head coach for Ken Collums who enter the season with the No.10 ranked team and one of the best
offense in the nation while McMurry had one of the best offenses in DIII last year. .

It took the Wildcats while to break the ice but middle of the second quarter ACU final reach the end zone and they didn't look back after that. IT turned out to be the most point score for ACU in the opening game since
last time the team met in 1971. But it wasn't just the offense that showed up. Nick Richardson (DE) tied the school record with 6 sacks and it was the ACU first shutout since 2006. ACU is now 44-43-4 in first game of the season.

Mitchell Gale was 19 out of 28 with 290 yards and one touchdown.  Marcel Threat ran for 88 yards in 14 carries averaging 6.3 yards per carries and two touchdowns. Taylor Gabriel did catch 7 balls for 108 yards and one touchdown.

Stats

Texas A&M-Kingsville 

Sources:

    
    
    
    
    

Both team enter the game ranked, ACU 9th and Texas A&M-Kingsville 24th, and with 1–0 record. ACU had won 8 straight against Javelinas. The Wildcats were without starting outside linebacker Chris Summers who suffered a right knee injury against McMurry and was out for the season.

Mitchell Gale arguably had his worst game in his college career with only 13 completed passes out of 31 for only 137 yards and his 23-game streak with a least one touchdown throw was snapped. A touchdown and three field goals was enough for Texas A&M-Kingsville to come away from Shotwell Stadium with a victory. This was the first time the Wildcats lost a home game in the regular season since 2009.

Darr. Cantu-Harkless rann for 70 yards in only 4 carries while catching 4 passes for 36 yards.

Tarleton State 

Sources:

    
    
    
    
    
    
    
    
    
    
    

ACU had won six of the last eight meetings between the teams. The Wildcats enter the game 0–1 in the conference and 1-1 overall while Tarleton was still unbeaten after a win on opening day against Midwest State.

Despite being down 10 at half, the Wildcats clawed themselves back into the game and were able to take the lead late in the third quarter thanks to some great puntreturns and kept it for the rest of the game.
ACU became only fourth team from the state of Texas to have won both in the Cowboys Stadium and the Cotton bowl. ACU and Gale have the most passing yards of any college teams and players in the Cowboys Stadium and Taylor Gabriel is the leading college wide receiver in the stadium in points (24).

Mitchell Gale was 27 out of 42 for 279 yards and 2 touchdowns. Mitchell Gale rushed for 38 yards in 11 carries and Darian Hogg did catch 8 balls for 67 yards.

Angelo State 

Sources:

    
    
    
    
    
    
    

The first true road trip waited No.19 ACU (2-1) when they visited Angelo State in San Angelo, Texas. ACU had won 9 out 10 last meetings against the Rams.

Abilene Christian was held to only 9 rushing yards the whole game while giving up 7 sacks in the 23–28 loss to Angelo State.

Weekly awards
Week 1 defensive player of the week: Nick Richardson. He had six sacks against McMurry.

Week 1 honorably mention: Mitchell Gale completed 68 percent of his passes for 290 yards.

Week 3 offensive player of the week: Taylor Gabriel (WR) who had 5 catches for 50 yards and two touchdowns.

Week 3 honorably mention: L.B. Suggs tipped the ball that ended in the first half preventing Tarleton State being more than 10 points up at the half. He had also a game high 11 tackles.

Stats

Team Offense

Points
Total Yards
Plays
Average Yards gained per play
First Downs

Passing Yards
Rushing Yards

% Passing
% Rushing

First Downs from 1st down

Passing yard per attemb
Rushing yard per attemb
10 yards or more plays

Player Offense

Passing
M. Gale

Receiving

D. Hogg

Rushing

T. Tarver

References

Abilene Christian
Abilene Christian Wildcats football seasons
Abilene Christian Wildcats football